Iddes Broadcast Group, Inc. is a Philippine radio network. Its corporate office is located at 3/F, Kingsheen Bldg., Don Mariano Marcos Ave., Roxas, Isabela. IBG operates a number of stations across regional places in the Philippines.

IBGI Stations

Defunct Stations

References

Radio stations in the Philippines
Philippine radio networks